Horsens Håndboldkub Elite is a Danish handball club. In the 2018/19 season its first female team plays in the Danish 1st division after its relegation in 2010. The team plays at home in Forum Horsens.

The club was established in 1985 when Horsens forenede Håndboldklubber (HfH) and Dagnæs IF chose to merge. And HfH itself is a merge of Horsens Freja and Horsens forenede Sportsklubber (HfS). Horsens HK therefore can lead its roots back to 1920 when they began playing handball in HfS. Horsens HK played in the top level uninterrupted from 1996 to 2010.

National players like Vivi Kjærsgaard, Gitte Madsen, Anja Byrial Hansen, Karen Brødsgaard, Christina Roslyng, Louise Pedersen, Karin Mortensen, Tina Ladefoged, Mette Sjøberg and Jane Wanggsøe Knudsen have played in Horsens HK.

Kits

Team

Current squad
Squad for the 2022-23 season

Goalkeeper
 1  Mathilde Bisgaard
 13  Claudia Rompen
 89  Emily Stang Sando
LW
 6  Maria Højgaard
 14  Amalie Grøn Hansen 
 26  Maria Mose Vestergaard
RW
 2  Anne Sofie Filtenborg
 7  Hege Løken
Pivots
 10  Majbritt Toft Hansen (pregnant)
 17  Stine Bodholt Nielsen
 55  Tamara Haggerty

Back players
LB
 21  Frederikke Gulmark (pregnant)
 29  Kristin Thorleifsdóttir
CB
 19  Laura Damgaard
 20  Emilie Winther  
 27  Annette Jensen
RB
 4  Maria Holm
 9  Nina Dano 
 25  Nicoline Olsen

Staff

Transfers 
Transfers for the season 2023-24

 Joining
  Claus Mogensen (Head coach) (from  SønderjyskE Håndbold)

 Leaving
  Jan Leslie (Head coach)
  Claudia Rompen (GK)
  Maria Mose Vestergaard (LW) (Retires)
  Amalie Grøn Hansen (LW)
  Frederikke Gulmark (LB)
  Emilie Winther (CB)
  Nina Dano (RB) (to  Odense Håndbold)
  Maria Holm (RB) (to  Silkeborg-Voel KFUM)
  Majbritt Toft Hansen (P)

Notable former players

 Mathilde Bjerregaard (2009-2011)
 Marianne Bonde (2005-2006)
 Karen Brødsgaard (1997-1998)
 Anja Byrial Hansen (1991-1993)
 Camilla Fangel (2010-2011)
 Annette Jensen (2010-2011)
 Vivi Kjærsgaard (1987-1992)
 Tine Ladefoged (1998-2010)
 Pernille Larsen (2004-2007)
 Karin Mortensen (2000-2002)
 Ann Grete Nørgaard (2009-2010)
 Mette Sjøberg (2002-2005)
 Louise Pedersen (1998-2001)
 Jane Wangsøe (2000-2008)
 Christina Roslyng (1995-1997)
 Annika Fredén (2005-2010)
 Sara Holmgren (2001–2005)
 Åsa Eriksson (2005-2007)
 Arna Sif Pálsdóttir (2009-2010)
 Maura Visser (2007-2009)
 Jeanette Nilsen (2003-2007)
 Olga Hoffmann (2007-2011)
 Beatrix Benyáts (2008-2010)
 Katarína Dubajová (2006-2009)

European games 
In 2004/05 they were eliminated in the quarterfinals of the EHF Cup after having eliminated three other teams in the previous rounds. One of these were the league rivals Randers HK

After the winning the Danish Handball Cup in 2004 they participated in the EHF Cup Winners' Cup in 2005/06 where they were eliminated in 4th round.

Arena 
Name: Forum Horsens
Capacity: 4,000
City: Horsens
Adresse: Langmarksvej 53, 8700 Horsens

Kit manufacturers
 Hummel

References 
 HH's history , horsenshk.dk 
 About Horsens HK at EHF's homepage, eurohandball.com

External links 
 Horsens HK's homepage

Danish handball clubs
1985 establishments in Denmark
Horsens Municipality
Handball clubs established in 1985